"Soulja Girl" is the second single from American rapper Soulja Boy's studio album souljaboytellem.com. Although the song was a top 40 hit in the United States and New Zealand, it did not follow the success of the last single, “Crank That (Soulja Boy)” in other countries. The song features the short-lived R&B group I-15. The song peaked at number thirty-two on the Billboard Hot 100, on the week ending December 8, 2007. The video ranked at #36 on BET's Notarized: Top 100 Videos of 2007 countdown.

Charts

Weekly charts

Year-end charts

References

2007 singles
Soulja Boy songs
Songs written by Soulja Boy
2007 songs
Interscope Records singles
Songs written by Mr. Collipark
Music videos directed by Dale Resteghini